Seacor Lee is a United States-flagged offshore support vessel, which formerly served as the offshore command and control for the Unified Command Center's Deepwater Horizon oil spill response. It is owned and operated by SEACOR Holdings.

References

2008 ships
Merchant ships of Liberia
Ships built in Mobile, Alabama